Barr'd Harbour is a small settlement located northeast of Pointe Riche. The mail office was closed in 1966, on September 13.

See also
 List of communities in Newfoundland and Labrador

Populated places in Newfoundland and Labrador